In the 2007–08 season, USM Alger competed in the Division 1 for the 28th time, as well as the They will be competing in Ligue 1, the Arab Champions League and the Algerian Cup. It was their 13th consecutive season in the top flight of Algerian football.

Competitions

Overview

Division 1

League table

Results summary

Results by round

Matches

Algerian Cup

Champions League

Round 32

Round 16

Group B

Squad information

Playing statistics

Appearances (Apps.) numbers are for appearances in competitive games only including sub appearances
Red card numbers denote:   Numbers in parentheses represent red cards overturned for wrongful dismissal.

Goalscorers
Includes all competitive matches. The list is sorted alphabetically by surname when total goals are equal.

Clean sheets
Includes all competitive matches.

Squad list
Last updated on  18 November 2016Note: Flags indicate national team as has been defined under FIFA eligibility rules. Players may hold more than one non-FIFA nationality.

Transfers

In

Out

References

USM Alger seasons
Algerian football clubs 2007–08 season